Stephen Woolfenden is a British television director. He previously worked as a second unit director for the Harry Potter films. He has directed other TV shows and recently the Doctor Who episode "Nightmare in Silver". He has more recently worked as the second unit director on The Legend of Tarzan film.

Background
Woolfenden is the son of English composer and conductor Guy Woolfenden.

Filmography

Television

References

External links

Living people
British television directors
1966 births